Cornelius J. Barton (born 1936) is an American metallurgical engineer, businessman and the acting president of Rensselaer Polytechnic Institute from April 1998 until July 1999.

He received bachelor's, master's and Ph.D. degrees in metallurgical engineering from Rensselaer Polytechnic Institute. He is a member of the engineering honor society Sigma Xi and is a brother of the Delta Phi social fraternity. After his undergraduate work, from 1958–1961, he was employed as a Metallurgical Process Engineer at Olin's Nuclear Fuel Division, which manufactured nuclear reactor cores for the U. S. Navy. In 1961, Barton returned to R.P.I. for graduate work in Engineering. Upon earning an M.S. and Ph.D. in metallurgical engineering, he joined US Steel's Research Laboratory in Monroeville, Pennsylvania, as a research manager in the Advanced Applied Research Division. While at U.S.S., he authored several research papers in refereed journals, submitted patent applications for novel steel compositions, and completed a project sponsored by the U. S. Air Force for improvements and problem solving in a complex high-strength, high-performance family of steels.

Barton then joined the Chase Brass & Copper Co. in 1969, a subsidiary of Kennecott Copper, as Director of Research and Development. From 1975-1980, he was General Manager of Chase Nuclear Inc. In 1981, he returned to Chase Headquarters in Shaker Heights, Ohio, to serve as Vice President, Technology, of Kennecott Engineered Systems Co., (KESCO). When Standard Oil of Ohio acquired Kennecott, the technologies of several Standard Oil manufacturing subsidiaries joined KESCO Technologies, and Barton's unit was renamed the Standard oil Chemicals and Industrial Products Co. Technology Group. During the M&A activities engaged by Kennecott, Dorr Oliver Incorporated was acquired. Dorr Oliver's business was twofold: the separation of liquids from solids, for instance by centrifugation, and the application of Fluid-Bed technology to a variety of process engineering, and incineration activities, including coal-fired boilers with sulphur capture. Dorr Oliver was an International Corporation with 16 subsidiaries in Europe, Asia, North and South America and Licensees in Japan and South Africa.

In 1986, Barton was appointed President of Dorr Oliver. Shortly thereafter, British Petroleum fully acquired Standard Oil and re-shaped and re-organized the energy activities. Dorr Oliver was sold, and an LBO group bought the company; Barton remained as President and CEO of Dorr Oliver. The Management of Dorr Oliver subsequently performed an MBO to take the Company and manage it for growth. A significant period of world-wide growth occurred, leading ultimately to an offer of purchase for the Company

In 1992, Harriman bought a 20 percent stake in Dorr Oliver. Dorr Oliver was then sold to a German company in 1995, and Barton retired as President after more than twelve years in that position.

He has been a member of the Rensselaer Board of Trustees beginning in 1991 until the present (as an active trustee from May 1991 through December 2012, and subsequently a trustee emeritus), and was the interim president of RPI from April 1998 until July 1999, until the current President, Shirley Ann Jackson was recruited. Barton Hall, a residence hall on the RPI campus that opened in 2000, was named in his honor.

References

External links
Rensselaer Polytechnic Institute – Archives – Presidents – Biography of Cornelius J. Barton

        
        
        
        
        
        

Presidents of Rensselaer Polytechnic Institute
Living people
American manufacturing businesspeople
21st-century American engineers
1936 births